Gwrgi, brother of Peredur, is a figure of medieval British legend.

Gwrgi may also refer to:

Gwrgi Severi, a huntsman mentioned in Culhwch ac Olwen who helps King Arthur track the boar Twrch Trwyth
Gwrgi Garwlwyd ("Rough grey"), a figure in one of the Welsh Triads

See also
Gurgi, character in Lloyd Alexander's series from the 1960s, The Chronicles of Prydain